Bremanger is a municipality in Vestland county, Norway. The village of Svelgen is the administrative centre of the municipality. Other villages include Bremanger, Berle, Davik, Isane, Kalvåg, Svelgen, Rugsund, and Ålfoten. Bremanger is the only municipality in Vestland, which is located in two districts. The northern and eastern parts comprising the villages of Oldeide, Berle, Rugsund, Davik, Isane, and Ålfoten is located in the Nordfjord region, while the villages of Bremanger, Kalvåg, Svelgen, Sørgulen, and Botnane are located in the Sunnfjord region. Politically, the municipality works with the Nordfjord region in the council of Nordfjord municipalities.

Bremanger has many tourist destinations such as Kalvåg, which has one of the largest and best-kept waterfront environment in the county, the Grotlesanden ocean beach, the Hornelen mountain, with the tallest sea cliff in Northern Europe, Rock carvings at Vingen, and the old trading stations of Rugsund and Smørhavn. The Bortne Tunnel was completed in 2013 to more easily connect the outer islands of Bremanger to the municipal centre of Svelgen. The Skatestraum Tunnel and Rugsund Bridge connect the islands to the mainland.

The  municipality is the 138th largest by area out of the 356 municipalities in Norway. Bremanger is the 214th most populous municipality in Norway with a population of 3,521.

General information

The parish of Kinn was established as a municipality on 1 January 1838 (see formannskapsdistrikt law). The northern district of Kinn was established as the parish (prestegjeld) of Bremanger within the municipality of Kinn in 1864. On 1 January 1866, the parish of Bremanger was established as a separate municipality with a population of 1,852. The Bremanger parish was sub-divided into new sub-parishes in the early 1900s. Midtgulen sub-parish was created in 1903 and Bremangerpollen in 1908.

During the 1960s, there were many municipal mergers across Norway due to the work of the Schei Committee. On 1 January 1964, the Husefest and Breivik farms were transferred from Bremanger to the neighboring municipality of Flora. On 1 January 1965, the neighboring municipality of Davik was dissolved and most of it was transferred to Bremanger. All of Davik south of the Nordfjorden and all the islands except Husevågøy, Grindøy, Gangsøy, and Risøy were merged into Bremanger. This added 1,567 residents to the population of Bremanger, bringing the new total to 5,600.

On 1 January 2020, the municipality became part of the newly created Vestland county after Sogn og Fjordane and Hordaland counties were merged.

Name
The name originally belonged to the fjord of Bremangerpollen. The first element is brim which means "breaker wave" or "heavy sea". The last element of the name is angr which means "fjord".

Coat of arms
The coat of arms was granted on 24 October 1986. The arms show a silver and blue wave, and it symbolizes the sea and hydro-electric power, both of which are of great economic importance to the municipality.

Churches
The Church of Norway has seven parishes within the municipality of Bremanger. It is part of the Nordfjord prosti (deanery) in the Diocese of Bjørgvin.

Government
All municipalities in Norway, including Bremanger, are responsible for primary education (through 10th grade), outpatient health services, senior citizen services, unemployment and other social services, zoning, economic development, and municipal roads. The municipality is governed by a municipal council of elected representatives, which in turn elect a mayor. The municipality falls under the Sogn og Fjordane District Court and the Gulating Court of Appeal.

Municipal council
The municipal council of Bremanger is made up of 23 representatives that are elected to four year terms. The party breakdown of the council is as follows:

Mayor
The mayor  of a municipality in Norway is a representative of the majority party of the municipal council who is elected to lead the council. The mayors of Bremanger (incomplete list):
2019–present: Anne Kristin Førde (Ap)
2015-2019: Audun Åge Røys (H)
2011-2015: Karl Vidar Førde (Sp)
2004-2011: Kåre Olav Svarstad (Ap)
1996-2004: Einar Kjerpeset (Sp)
1988-1996: Roar Førde (H)
1982-1988: Svein Kåre Senneset (Ap)

Geography

Bremanger is located along the south side of the Nordfjorden. Most of the municipality is on the mainland, but there are many islands that are also part of the municipality including Bremangerlandet, Rugsundøya, and Frøya, the three largest. These islands are separated from the mainland by the Frøysjøen strait.

Bremanger is bordered to the north by the municipalities of Vågsøy and Eid (across the fjord), to the east by Gloppen, to the south by Flora, and to the west by the North Sea. The Frøysjøen is the sea between the mainland and the main islands of Bremangerlandet and Frøya. The Gulen fjord branches off of the Frøysjøen, and that fjord splits off into the Nordgulen, Midtgulen, and Sørgulen. On the east end of the municipality is the Isefjord and Ålfotfjorden. Valleys in the municipality include the Førdedalen.

Industry
Elkem Bremanger is the largest company in Bremanger. The company's own port facility provides good and regular connections with the main ports of Norway and the rest of Europe. Elkem Bremanger has specialized in the manufacturing of silicon metal, ferrosilicon, and specialty inoculants. Silicon metals are primarily used in electronics, solar, and aluminium industries.

The variety of Elkem Bremanger's operations shows the importance it places on both tradition and looking toward the future. The expansion of hydropower resources began in 1917, while the first pig iron production began in 1928. The company then developed and patented several of its production processes, and today manufactures metallurgic products and chemicals for the world market. Much has happened since 1917, but the company is still known for its developmental know-how and state-of-the-art technology.

Attractions

Tongane Coastal Fortress
Tongane Coastal Fortress lies on the western end of the island of Rugsundøya near the mouth of the Nordfjorden. This is one of the largest German fortifications which was built in Norway during World War II. The coastal fort was attacked under the well-known Måløy raid, Operation Archery, during Christmas 1941. The majority of the fortification still remains, among other the main cannons and soldier's barracks. The fort at Rugsundøy is situated with a good view over the approach to the town of Måløy and the entrance to Nordfjorden.

Ålfotbreen Glacier
The Gjegnalundsbreen glacier lies northeast of the Ålfotbreen glacier.

Hornelen
The legendary mountain cliff Hornelen is situated straight across the fjord from Vingen rock carving site. Many legends are linked to this mountain which is Europe's tallest sea cliff. It raises  over the sea and is a good landmark for ships. Over the centuries, it has been a well-known sailing mark. The trip to the top of Hornelen takes approximately 3 hours from Hunskår, or 4 hours from Berleneset.

Kalvåg
The fishing village of Kalvåg is the largest and best preserved fishing village in Western Norway. In 1860, there were thousands of people working in the large herring fisheries. Today, approximately 500 people live there.

Vamråkbuene is situated in Kalvåg. During the large herring fisheries in the middle of the 18th century, thousands of fishermen visited Kalvåg. Vamråkbuene represents one part of the trading life that the herring fisheries created, and today it is part of the Coastal museum in Vestland.

Myklebust Farm
At the Myklebust hill farm, there is still a working hill farm. The hill farm in Ålfoten is authentic and unique in this part of Norway. Many of the local hill farms have stopped running and following the tradition of moving the livestock to the hill farms in the summer.

Rugsund
The islands of Storøya and Litleøya (Big island and Little island) lie in the sound, providing shelter for the old trading post at Rugsund. The excellent, sheltered harbour centrally located beside the inner shipping fairway along the coast was popular with seafarers. Today, the harbour is very popular with boat tourists who have seriously begun to discover the attractions of this peaceful, idyllic harbour.

Rugsund Handelsstad  is a preserved trading post dated back to the 17th century. The historical and restored buildings are clustered around the edge of the sea.

Smørhavn Handelstad
Smørhamn Handelstad (Old Trading Post) is from the 16th century and has been an important junction point for clippers and cutters (sailing boats) between Nordfjord and Bergen. The trading post was important to fishermen and to local inhabitants in the area. Here you could buy everything from sharpening stones, pins, syrup to soap, together with beer and distilled spirits. In 1790, there were approximately 30 houses in Smørhamn. Today, there are a few boat houses and houses. Presently, Smørhamn Handelstad is privately owned and not open to tourists. You can see the trading post from the road and from the sea approximately 4 km from the centre of Kalvåg.

Vingen
The Rock carvings at Vingen is one of the largest rock carving sites in Northern Europe. Animal carvings, human figures, and many other abstract symbols are sketched on the mountains. The oldest dates back 4,500 years. In all, more than 1,500 figures are registered. Vingen has probably been a cultist meeting place in the region for thousands of years.

Botnane
If you stop at the grave mounds at Botnane you get a feeling of the Bronze Age. There are altogether 8 mounds dating back to early Stone Age and Bronze Age. Because some of them are so large, it's easy to see them from the road.

Historic Churches

Ålfoten Church
Ålfoten Church is the oldest wooden church in Nordfjord. The log timber church was built in 1610 on the site of an earlier stave church. In the small church, its history is still on the walls, which is a testimony to life and destiny of the remote fjord through the ages.

Rugsund Church
Rugsund Church was built at the beginning of the 1930s. It is a very interesting church and is rich in decoration with wall paintings, Mosaic glass, and carvings. The church was designed by Hans Ditlev F. Linstow. It is often said to be the most beautiful church in Nordfjord.

Vicarage
The poet-priest Claus Frimann lived and worked in Davik. Frimann (1780–1822) established a reading room for the village's young men and women. But he didn't just carry out unselfish activities. In his official capacity he also looked after the large estate and was also known to be rather zealous in collection of debts and land taxes. Frimann is best known as a "poet priest" and he has often been mentioned in the same connection as Petter Dass. The vicarage is situated on the priest's farm estate. Here you can see a memorial column to Claus Frimann at the church.

Beaches
Grotlesanden is one of the largest sandy beaches in outer Bremanger. Here there is silky soft sand as far as the eye can see.

Vetvika is situated on the north-western side of Bremangerlandet island. Vetvika is accessible only by boat or foot. Vetvika has a beautiful sandy beach and an old graveyard. Vetvika is deserted since the 1950s, but the houses still remain well kept as holiday houses. The largest farm in Bremanger in early times was the farm Solheim at Vetvika. The farm is situated on the northern side of Vetvika.

Notable people 
 Nikolai Astrup (1880–1928) a distinctive, innovative painter with intense use of colour
 Arvid Eikevik (1935–2015) a Norwegian painter
 Bjørg Hope Galtung (born 1942) a Norwegian politician, Mayor of Jondal 1979-1993
 Åge Nigardsøy (1954–2008) disability rights activist, hobby drummer and former piano tuner

References

External links
Municipal fact sheet from Statistics Norway 

 
Municipalities of Vestland
1866 establishments in Norway